Roque de los Muchachos Observatory (ORM) is an astronomical observatory located in the municipality of Garafía on the island of La Palma in the Canary Islands, Spain. The observatory site is operated by the Instituto de Astrofísica de Canarias, based on nearby Tenerife. ORM is part of the European Northern Observatory.

The seeing statistics at ORM make it the second-best location for optical and infrared astronomy in the Northern Hemisphere, after Mauna Kea Observatory, Hawaii. The site also has some of the most extensive astronomical facilities in the Northern Hemisphere; its fleet of telescopes includes the 10.4 m Gran Telescopio Canarias, the world's largest single-aperture optical telescope as of July 2009, the William Herschel Telescope (second largest in Europe), and the adaptive optics corrected Swedish 1-m Solar Telescope.

The observatory was established in 1985, after 15 years of international work and cooperation by several countries, with the Spanish island hosting many telescopes from Britain, The Netherlands, Spain, and other countries. The island provided better seeing conditions for the telescopes that had been moved to Herstmonceux by the Royal Greenwich Observatory, including the  98 inch aperture Isaac Newton Telescope (the largest reflector in Europe at that time). When it was moved to the island it was upgraded to a 100-inch (2.54 meter), and many even larger telescopes from various nations would be hosted there.

History 
The building of the observatory goes back to 1969, with the start of the Northern Hemisphere Observatory project. After ten years of research on the site there was a big international agreement between  several nations to establish an international Observatory at La Palma.

The observatory began operation around 1984 with the Isaac Newton Telescope, which was moved to La Palma from the Royal Greenwich Observatory site at Herstmonceux Castle in East Sussex, England. The move was troubled, and it is widely recognized that it would have been cheaper to build a new telescope on-site rather than to move an existing one.

The observatory was first staffed by representatives from Spain, Sweden, Denmark and the United Kingdom. Other countries which became involved later include Germany, Italy, Norway, the Netherlands, Finland, Iceland, and the United States.

The observatory was officially inaugurated on 29 June 1985 by the Spanish royal family and six European heads of state. Four helicopter pads were built at the observatory to allow the dignitaries to arrive in comfort. 
The observatory has expanded considerably over time, with the
4.2m William Herschel Telescope opened in 1987, the Nordic Optical Telescope in 1988 and several smaller solar or specialized telescopes; the Galileo National Telescope opened in 1998 and the Gran Telescopio Canarias opened in 2006, with its full aperture in 2009.

A fire on the mountainside in 1997 damaged one of the gamma-ray telescopes, but subsequent fires in September 2005 and August 2009 did no serious damage to either the buildings or the telescopes.

In 2016, the Instituto de Astrofisica de Canarias and Cherenkov Telescope Array Observatory signed an agreement to host Cherenkov Telescope Array’s northern hemisphere array at the ORM.

In 2016, the observatory was announced as the second-choice location for the Thirty Meter Telescope, in the event that the Mauna Kea site is not feasible.

Telescopes/observatories
The Spanish island is host to the premiere collection of telescopes and observatories from around the World, for the northern hemisphere excluding the Hawaiian islands which has a different mix of telescopes. The 10.4 meter Grand Telescope Canarias is the largest single aperture for an astronomical observatory in the world.

Carlsberg Meridian Telescope (1984–2013)
Dutch Open Telescope
First G-APD Cherenkov Telescope (FACT) (2011– )
Galileo National Telescope
Gran Telescopio Canarias (2007– )
HEGRA
Isaac Newton Telescope
Jacobus Kapteyn Telescope
Liverpool Telescope (2003– )
MAGIC
MASCARA
Mercator Telescope
Nordic Optical Telescope
Swedish Solar Telescope
Wide Angle Search for Planets (WASP)
William Herschel Telescope
 European Solar Telescope (In project)

Gallery

See also 
 Astronomical seeing
 Cherenkov Telescope Array
 Gran Telescopio Canarias
 IACT
 Instituto de Astrofísica de Canarias
 Isaac Newton Group
 La Palma
 List of space telescopes (Another important source of astronomical observations in this period)
 Roque de los Muchachos
 Teide Observatory

References

External links 

Observatory website (English)
Current weather and astronomical conditions
Panoramic 360 Observatory
Travel information
 MAGIC gamma-ray observatory
 CTA gamma-ray observatory

Astronomical observatories in La Palma